Judith A. Lawrence CM is a Canadian puppeteer associated with the long-running CBC children's television program Mr. Dressup.  Her best known characters were Casey and Finnegan, although she also created other occasional characters, such as Aunt Bird and Alligator Al. Judith was born in Bairnsdale, Victoria, Australia and grew up in Ballarat, Victoria, Australia. She came to Canada at age 22, earning her living as a kindergarten teacher. She taught at Cockcroft Public School in Deep River, Ontario.
 
After a successful audition, Lawrence started work for the CBC, where she soon created her most famous puppet characters for the Butternut Square TV series and they made the transition to Mr. Dressup.  Lawrence retired as the puppeteer of the show in 1989.

Lawrence also wrote many books in The Young Canada Reading Series for Thomas Nelson publishers.  Lawrence co-authored a series of books for D.C. Heath on women and work.

In the 1960s she co-founded The Voice of Women. In the 1970s she was on the first National Action Committee on the Status of Women (NAC). She continued her peace and feminist views through newspapers like Broadside. She was awarded the Order of Canada in 2001 for her work as both a puppeteer and an activist.

After retiring, Lawrence moved from Toronto to Hornby Island, British Columbia where she became a strong community leader for the island, a designer of the recycling depot, and a farmer/environmentalist.

References

Canadian puppeteers
Australian expatriates in Canada
People from the Comox Valley Regional District
Year of birth missing (living people)
Living people
Place of birth missing (living people)
Members of the Order of Canada